Garwood is an unincorporated community in Colorado County, Texas, United States. It is located on State Highway 71 at virtually the geographic midpoint between Columbus, Texas and El Campo, Texas. Nearly 1,000 people lived in Garwood in 2000.

Geography
According to the Handbook of Texas, the community had an estimated population of 975 in 2000. Garwood has a post office with the ZIP code 77442.

Education
Public education in the community of Garwood is provided by the Rice Consolidated Independent School District. Zoned campuses include Garwood School (grades K-6; located in Garwood), Rice Junior High School (grades 7-8), and Rice High School (grades 9-12).

The designated community college for Rice CISD is Wharton County Junior College.

Climate
The climate in this area is characterized by hot, humid summers and generally mild to cool winters.  According to the Köppen Climate Classification system, Garwood has a humid subtropical climate, abbreviated "Cfa" on climate maps.

References

External links

Unincorporated communities in Colorado County, Texas
Unincorporated communities in Texas